Abraham Lincoln Wolstenholme (March 4, 1861 – March 4, 1916) was a professional baseball player. He appeared in three games in Major League Baseball for the Philadelphia Quakers in the 1883 season, two as a catcher and one as a left fielder. In three career games, he had one hit in 11 at-bats.

Wolstenholme died in his home town of Philadelphia, Pennsylvania in 1916, of Uremia.

References

External links

1861 births
1916 deaths
Baseball players from Philadelphia
19th-century baseball players
Major League Baseball catchers
Philadelphia Quakers players
Oil City (minor league baseball) players
Frankford (minor league baseball) players